The Co-operatives and Community Benefit Societies Act 2003 (c.15) was an Act of the Parliament of the United Kingdom that received Royal Assent.

It was repealed in full in 2014 by the Co-operative and Community Benefit Societies Act 2014.

See also
 Co-operative and Community Benefit Societies Act 2014
 Co-operative and Community Benefit Societies and Credit Unions Act 2010
 Industrial and provident society

References

United Kingdom Acts of Parliament 2003
Co-operatives in the United Kingdom